Elizabeth "Ella" Gunson (born 9 July 1989) is a New Zealand field hockey player.

She was first selected for the Black Sticks Women in June 2009, along with ten other players as the Black Sticks squad was overhauled following its last place finish at the 2008 Beijing Olympics.
Gunson has competed for the New Zealand women's national field hockey team (the Black Sticks Women) since 2009, including at the 2010 Commonwealth Games and the 2012 Summer Olympics. 
She participated at the  2020 Women's FIH Pro League.

References

External links
 

1989 births
Living people
New Zealand female field hockey players
Olympic field hockey players of New Zealand
Field hockey players at the 2012 Summer Olympics
Field hockey players at the 2010 Commonwealth Games
Field hockey players from Whangārei
Commonwealth Games silver medallists for New Zealand
Female field hockey midfielders
Commonwealth Games medallists in field hockey
Commonwealth Games gold medallists for New Zealand
Field hockey players at the 2018 Commonwealth Games
Female field hockey defenders
Field hockey players at the 2020 Summer Olympics
20th-century New Zealand women
21st-century New Zealand women
Medallists at the 2010 Commonwealth Games
Medallists at the 2018 Commonwealth Games